Darko Ramovš (born 7 April 1973) is a retired Serbian football player.

He was a sports director in his previous club FK Čukarički from 2005 until 2010.  In summer 2013 he was appointed sports director in the newly promoted Serbian First League club FK Sinđelić Beograd.

In the 2015–16 season he was the president of the Assembly of the clubs of the Serbian First League.

From the 2018–19 season he is the General Secretary of the Professional Clubs Association in Serbia, Super League and First League.

References

External links
 Profile at Srbijafudbal 
 Darko Ramovš at KickersArchiv.de 
 

Living people
1973 births
Footballers from Belgrade
Serbian footballers
FC Prishtina players
OFK Beograd players
FK Čukarički players
Stuttgarter Kickers players
1. FC Schweinfurt 05 players
Expatriate footballers in Germany
Association football defenders
2. Bundesliga players